Larisa Nikolaevna Kurkina born December 18, 1973) is a Russian cross-country skier who has competed since 2002. She won a gold medal in the 4 × 5 km relay at the 2006 Winter Olympics in Turin.

Kurkina won a silver medal in the 4 × 5 km relay at the 2005 FIS Nordic World Ski Championships and finished fifth in the 30 km at those same championships. She also has one individual victory in a 2004 individual sprint event in Russia.

Cross-country skiing results
All results are sourced from the International Ski Federation (FIS).

Olympic Games
 1 medal – (1 gold)

World Championships
 1 medal – (1 silver)

World Cup

Season standings

Team podiums

 2 victories – (2 ) 
 7 podiums – (6 , 1 )

References

External links
 
 
 

1973 births
Living people
Sportspeople from Bryansk
Russian female cross-country skiers
Olympic gold medalists for Russia
Cross-country skiers at the 2006 Winter Olympics
Olympic cross-country skiers of Russia
Olympic medalists in cross-country skiing
FIS Nordic World Ski Championships medalists in cross-country skiing
Medalists at the 2006 Winter Olympics